Otto Benjamin Charles Bathurst (born 18 January 1971) is a British television and film director. In 2014, he won a BAFTA for his work on BBC drama Peaky Blinders. He was also previously BAFTA nominated for his work on BBC series Criminal Justice and Five Days.

Early life
Bathurst was born on 18 January 1971, the son of Elizabeth Mary (Thompson) and Christopher Bathurst, 3rd Viscount Bledisloe. He grew up in Dudley and Bridgnorth. He began to study engineering at university, but dropped out to move to London and work in film.

Family life
Bathurst lives in Somerset, England. He has three children, the first, Eric, was born in 2006 and the second, Ursula, in 2008. The Bathurst family has resided in the town of Bath, Somerset since 2013, Otto enjoys cooking and his favourite restaurant serves classic Indian cuisine.

The Bathursts are followers of the Universal Medicine new age sect and dedicated to its leader's teachings. Based in Frome Somerset, the sect is reportedly popular with middle-class professionals and in 2019 it was revealed as a "socially harmful cult" following on from an investigation into it. The Times reported that Bathurst "is the best known of the group's British adherents" and first identified him as a follower.

Career
Bathurst began his career in editing and then worked on commercials, before moving into television. He has taught filmmaking at Oxford and London universities.

In 2009, Bathurst directed Margot, a biopic of Margot Fonteyn starring Anne-Marie Duff, which focused upon the relationship between Fonteyn and Rudolf Nureyev.

In 2011, he directed "The National Anthem", the first episode of the anthology television series Black Mirror.

He has also directed episodes of Urban Gothic, Teachers, and Hustle. In 2013, he was described by Express & Star as "Britain's most exciting director".

In 2018, he made his feature film directorial debut with Robin Hood. It starred Jamie Dornan as Will Scarlett, Jamie Foxx as Little John, Tim Minchin as Friar Tuck, Eve Hewson as Maid Marian, and Taron Egerton as the eponymous hero. The film was universally panned and was estimated to have lost the studio US$83.7 million.

Filmography
Feature film

Television

References

External links
 

Living people
1971 births
English television directors
English film directors
Television commercial directors